Joseph Turagabeci (born  November 19, 1994 ) is a Fijian footballer. He represented Fiji in the football competition at the 2016 Summer Olympics.

References

External links

Fiji international footballers
1994 births
Living people
Footballers at the 2016 Summer Olympics
Olympic footballers of Fiji
Fijian footballers
Association football forwards
Suva F.C. players